Below is a list of members of the Order of Merit from the order's creation in 1902 until the present day. The number shown is the individual's place in the wider order of appointment since the Order of Merit's inception;

References

Sources
 

John Piper Artist